Arvo Juhani Hilli (born 4 August 1930) is a Finnish hurdler. He competed in the men's 400 metres hurdles at the 1952 Summer Olympics.

References

External links
 

1930 births
Living people
Athletes (track and field) at the 1952 Summer Olympics
Finnish male hurdlers
Olympic athletes of Finland
People from Padasjoki
Sportspeople from Päijät-Häme